Nagle Dam is a mass concrete type dam located on the Mgeni River, near Cato Ridge, KwaZulu-Natal, South Africa.It was established in 1950 and serves mainly for municipal and industrial purposes. The hazard potential of the dam has been ranked high (3).

See also
List of reservoirs and dams in South Africa
List of rivers of South Africa

References 

 List of South African Dams from the Department of Water Affairs and Forestry (South Africa)

Dams in South Africa
Dams completed in 1950